Wolf is a 1994 American romantic horror film directed by Mike Nichols and starring Jack Nicholson, Michelle Pfeiffer, James Spader, Kate Nelligan, Richard Jenkins, Christopher Plummer, Eileen Atkins, David Hyde Pierce, and Om Puri. It was written by Jim Harrison and Wesley Strick, and an uncredited Elaine May. The music was composed by Ennio Morricone and the cinematography was done by Giuseppe Rotunno.

Plot
Will Randall is bitten by a black wolf he accidentally struck while driving home in Vermont. Afterwards, he gets demoted from editor-in-chief of a publishing house when it gets taken over by tycoon Raymond Alden, who replaces him with Will's protégé Stewart Swinton. Will discovers that Stewart had begged Raymond for the job behind Will's back and suspects that Stewart is having an affair with his wife Charlotte, after he smells Stewart's scent on her clothes. Will bites Stewart on the hand while entering his apartment and rushes to the room to find Charlotte half-naked. His worst fears are confirmed, and he leaves without saying a word. Will becomes more aggressive as he starts taking on the characteristics of a wolf.

With the help of Raymond's headstrong daughter Laura, Will sets out for his new life. His first werewolf transformation takes place at Laura's estate, where he wakes up at night and hunts down a deer. In the morning, Will finds himself on the bank of a stream, with blood all over his face and hands. He visits Dr. Vijav Alezais, who gives him an amulet to protect him from turning completely into a wolf. However, he cannot persuade Will to infect him. That night, Will transforms into a werewolf again: he breaks into the zoo and steals handcuffs from a policeman. Muggers want his wallet, but Will attacks and bites the fingers off one of them. He wakes up in his hotel, with no memory of what happened.

Will organizes a mutiny of writers, who threaten to leave the publishing house unless he is retained as editor-in-chief. Raymond agrees, and Will's first act is to fire Stewart, urinating on his shoes in a bathroom and claiming he is "marking his territory". While washing his hands, Will finds the fingers in his handkerchief and realizes he has wounded someone. He cuffs himself to a radiator in his hotel room, but Laura arrives and downplays his belief that he is werewolf. The next morning, Detective Bridger knocks on Will's door to inform him that Charlotte was found dead in Central Park with canine DNA on her. Will wonders if he murdered Charlotte, but does not know that it was actually Stewart who killed her.

Believing Will is a murderer, Laura goes to the police station. There, she runs into Stewart, who makes an animal-like pass at her while sporting increasingly obvious werewolf traits (noticeably, golden eyes). Laura hurries away, making arrangements for her and Will to leave the country. After killing two guards at the estate, Stewart corners Laura in the barn with the intention to rape her, but Will intervenes after discarding the amulet restraining him and the two fight; in the end, Stewart is shot to death by Laura after getting heavily mauled by Will. Still in a half-human state, Will has a brief moment with Laura and then runs into the forest before anyone else can arrive.

Minutes later, Laura herself shows heightened senses when the police arrive; telling Bridger that she can smell vodka on his breath before taking her leave. The final scene is a close-up of her face and of Will finally turning into a full wolf howling for Laura. Then it goes back to Laura's face as her eyes become wolf-like, hinting that she herself is transforming into a werewolf.

Cast

Production
Screenwriter Jim Harrison left the production because of creative differences with director Mike Nichols, claiming, "I wanted Dionysian, but he wanted Apollonian. He took my wolf and made it into a Chihuahua. I cracked up for 10 minutes and then went out into the country and stood in front of a wolf den and apologized while my dog hid under the truck." Following his experience with the film, Harrison decided to leave Hollywood.

Mia Farrow was initially signed on for the role of Charlotte Randall, but was apparently considered too controversial a choice by the film company due to the then-current Woody Allen and Soon-Yi Previn affair. She decided to take a pay cut to accommodate the studios but had to eventually bow out in the long run due to other scheduling conflicts. Kate Nelligan was immediately cast instead. Sharon Stone turned down the role of Laura Alden, eventually played by Michelle Pfeiffer. 

Filming took place in New York City, Long Island, and Los Angeles. The exteriors for Raymond Alden's country mansion were filmed at Old Westbury Gardens in Nassau County, New York. Will Randall's publishing offices are in the Bradbury Building in downtown Los Angeles, a location frequently used in movies.

The film was shot from early April to late July in 1993. Its release was delayed for six to eight months, in order to reshoot the poorly received ending.

The wolves were professionally trained by employees from Thousand Oaks, California's Animal Actors of Hollywood and Palmdale, California's Performing Animal Troupe.

Reception

Box office
Wolf grossed $65 million domestically and $66 million internationally, for a total of $131 million worldwide.

Critical response
Wolf holds a score of 62% on Rotten Tomatoes based on 58 reviews. The website's consensus reads, "Wolf misses the jugular after showing flashes of killer instinct early on, but engaging stars and deft direction make this a unique horror-romance worth watching".

Janet Maslin of The New York Times wrote, "So long as it stays confined to the level of metaphor, as it does in the first hour of Wolf, this idea really is irresistible." Roger Ebert of the Chicago Sun-Times wrote, "Wolf is both more and less than a traditional werewolf movie. Less, because it doesn't provide the frankly vulgar thrills and excesses some audience members are going to be hoping for. And more, because Nicholson and his director, Mike Nichols, are halfway serious about exploring what might happen if a New York book editor did become a werewolf". Hal Hinson of The Washington Post wrote, "In its own delightfully peculiar way, the film is the only one of its kind ever made – a horror film about office politics ... The movie isn't wholly great; it starts to unravel just after the midway point. Still, there are charms enough all the way through to make it the most seductive, most enjoyable film of the summer". Peter Travers of Rolling Stone called it "a rapturous romantic thriller with a darkly comic subtext about what kills human values".

Desson Howe of The Washington Post wrote that it "works beautifully when it's rooted in reality, when the Werewolf Thing functions as a multiple metaphor for unleashed-id sexuality and the law of the corporate jungle" Todd McCarthy of Variety wrote, "The studio must convince the horror/special-effects crowd to attend a Jack Nicholson/Michelle Pfeiffer/Mike Nichols picture and persuade the film-makers' fans to see a genre pic... But no matter how snazzy the trappings, when you get down to it, this is still, at heart, a werewolf picture". Time Out wrote, "Quite frankly, it's hard to fathom why exactly anyone would have wanted to make this slick, glossy, but utterly redundant werewolf movie... Overall, this is needlessly polished nonsense: not awful; just toothless, gutless and bloodless."

Audiences polled by CinemaScore gave the film an average grade of "B" on an A+ to F scale.

Year-end lists
 Honorable mention – Mike Clark, USA Today
 Honorable mention –  Glenn Lovell, San Jose Mercury News
 Honorable mention – Howie Movshovitz, The Denver Post
 Honorable mention – Bob Carlton, The Birmingham News

Awards and nominations
Wolf won a Saturn Award for Best Writing for Jim Harrison and Wesley Strick's screenplay, and it was nominated for a further 5 Saturn Awards, in the categories of Best Horror Film, Best Actor (Jack Nicholson), Best Actress (Michelle Pfeiffer), Best Supporting Actor (James Spader) and Best Make-up (Rick Baker).

Ennio Morricone was nominated for the Grammy Award for Best Instrumental Composition Written for a Motion Picture or for Television.

See also

References

External links
 
 
 
 
 

1994 films
1994 fantasy films
1994 horror films
1994 thriller films
1990s American films
1990s English-language films
1990s horror thriller films
1990s romantic thriller films
American fantasy thriller films
American horror thriller films
American romantic horror films
American romantic thriller films
American werewolf films
Columbia Pictures films
Films about adultery in the United States
Films directed by Mike Nichols
Films produced by Douglas Wick
Films scored by Ennio Morricone
Films set in New York City
Films set in Vermont
Films shot in Los Angeles
Films shot in New York City
Films shot in Vermont